Nippononeta is a genus of Asian dwarf spiders that was first described by K. Y. Eskov in 1992.

Species
 it contains twenty-five species:
Nippononeta alpina (Li & Zhu, 1993) – China
Nippononeta bituberculata Seo, 2018 – Korea
Nippononeta bursa Yin, 2012 – China
Nippononeta cheunghensis (Paik, 1978) – Korea
Nippononeta coreana (Paik, 1991) – China, Korea
Nippononeta elongata Ono & Saito, 2001 – Japan
Nippononeta embolica Tanasevitch, 2005 – Russia
Nippononeta kaiensis Ono & Saito, 2001 – Japan
Nippononeta kantonis Ono & Saito, 2001 – Japan
Nippononeta kurilensis Eskov, 1992 (type) – Russia, Japan
Nippononeta masatakana Ono & Saito, 2001 – Japan
Nippononeta masudai Ono & Saito, 2001 – Japan
Nippononeta minuta (Oi, 1960) – Japan
Nippononeta nodosa (Oi, 1960) – Japan
Nippononeta obliqua (Oi, 1960) – Korea, Japan
Nippononeta ogatai Ono & Saito, 2001 – Japan
Nippononeta okumae Ono & Saito, 2001 – Japan
Nippononeta onoi Bao, Bai & Tu, 2017 – Japan
Nippononeta pentagona (Oi, 1960) – Mongolia, Japan
Nippononeta projecta (Oi, 1960) – Mongolia, Korea, Japan
Nippononeta silvicola Ono & Saito, 2001 – Japan
Nippononeta sinica Tanasevitch, 2006 – China
Nippononeta subnigra Ono & Saito, 2001 – Japan
Nippononeta ungulata (Oi, 1960) – Korea, Japan
Nippononeta xiphoidea Ono & Saito, 2001 – Japan

See also
 List of Linyphiidae species (I–P)

References

Araneomorphae genera
Linyphiidae
Spiders of Asia
Spiders of Russia